Yeolnyeo, also called Yeolbu, is defined as 'virtuous woman' during the Joseon dynasty of Korea.

In Joseon, the emphasis was placed on the study of Confucianism. Women were educated to be filial to their parents and in-laws, loyal to their husbands and to obey their sons after the deaths of their husbands. Gyeongguk Daejeon, a code of law completed in early Joseon, stipulated a "prohibition of remarriage of widows". Widows who remarried could be sentenced to death.

A woman's chastity and loyalty to her spouse were considered so important that the government gave awards called yeolnyeo to those who led an exemplary life by remaining loyal to their late husbands. Originally intended to set a good example, the award created a situation which got worse in late Joseon, where widows would kill themselves in order to be acknowledged as 'virtuous women', a title that brought honour to both sides of the family. It reached a point where a betrothed woman would commit suicide if her husband-to-be died before the wedding ceremony.

See also 

 The Memorial Gate for Virtuous Women (Film)
Society in the Joseon Dynasty

References 

Culture in Joseon
History of women in Korea
Confucian ethics
Social history of Korea